Since the debut of the anime adaptation of Akira Toriyama's Dr. Slump manga series in 1981, Toei Animation (formerly Toei Doga) has produced 11 animated films based on the franchise.

In 2008, all eleven films were released in a remastered DVD box set titled Slump the Box Movies on September 21. On June 12, 2013, Discotek Media announced they acquired the first five Dr. Slump films for release in North America. They released all five in a two-disc DVD box set in Japanese with English subtitles on July 29, 2014.

1980s films
The first film was produced just three months after the anime started, being shown at the  alongside One Hundred and One Dalmatians and Taiyo Sentai Sun Vulcan.  was released on July 18, 1981. It adapts chapters 32 and 33 of the manga, following as Senbei Norimaki travels to Wonder Island in order to acquire an ingredient for a love potion. It was released on VHS on August 14, 1987. An anime comic adaptation was released in March 1995.

 entered theaters on July 10, 1982. It follows Senbei and the other main characters as they venture into space to save Midori Yamabuki from being forced to marry the galactic tyrant Mashirito. A novelization written by one of the screenwriters Shun'ichi Yukimuro was released on July 15, 1982. The film was released on VHS on December 15, 1984. An anime comic adaptation was released in April 1995. The anime comics of the first and second films were collected together and released under the Shueisha Jump Remix imprint in December 2006. The soundtrack to the film was released on September 22, 2004 by Columbia Music Entertainment under the title .

 was released on March 13, 1983. The main characters and others enter the Around the World Grand Prix, racing to marry a princess or win a hefty monetary prize. It was shown at the Toei Manga Festival alongside Batten Robomaru Obakekau Shōjo, Kagaku Sentai Dynaman and Aesop's Fable. It was released on VHS on January 14, 1987. An anime comic adaptation was released in June 1995.

 was released on December 22, 1984. Set in 1929, several parties try to steal the Rainbow Eye, which can grant any wish. It was shown at the Toei Manga Festival alongside Space Sheriff Shaider and Kinnikuman Great Riot! Seigi Choujin. It was released on VHS on February 21, 1985. An anime comic adaptation was released in August 1995. The anime comics of the third and fourth films were collected together and released under the Shueisha Jump Remix imprint in January 2007.

 was released on July 13, 1985. The children of Penguin Village appear in Mechapolis, where anything they can imagine appears made out of mecha. It was shown at the Toei Manga Festival alongside Captain Tsubasa: Europe Daikessen, Kinnikuman Counterattack! The Underground Space Choujins and Dengeki Sentai Changeman: Shuttle Base! Close Call. It was released on VHS on November 21, 1985. An anime comic adaptation was released in September 1995.

1990s films
 was released on March 6, 1993. It was shown at the  alongside Dragon Ball Z: Broly – The Legendary Super Saiyan. An anime comic adaptation was released in July 1993. The film was released on VHS on October 8, 1993.

 was released on July 10, 1993. It was shown at the Toei Anime Fair alongside Dragon Ball Z: Bojack Unbound and YuYu Hakusho. An anime comic adaptation was released in November 1993. The film was released on VHS on April 8, 1994.

 was released on March 12, 1994. It was shown at the Toei Anime Fair alongside Dragon Ball Z: Broly – Second Coming and Slam Dunk. It was released on VHS on November 11, 1994. An anime comic adaptation was released in December 1994.

 was released on July 9, 1994. It was shown at the Toei Anime Fair alongside Dragon Ball Z: Bio-Broly and Slam Dunk: Zenkoku Seiha da! Sakuragi Hanamichi. An anime comic adaptation was released in February 1995. The film was released on VHS on April 14, 1995.

 released on March 6, 1999 is the only film produced during the broadcast of the second anime adaptation. It was shown at the Toei Anime Fair alongside the Yu-Gi-Oh! and Digimon Adventure films. Comedy duo Kyaeen provide guest voices. It was released on VHS on September 10, 1999.

Dr. Mashirito and Abale-chan
To promote the release of the first Dr. Slump - Arale-chan anime DVD box set, Toriyama drew a one-shot manga published in the April 2007 issue of Monthly Shōnen Jump. It was adapted into a five-minute short titled  that entered theaters alongside One Piece Movie: The Desert Princess and the Pirates: Adventures in Alabasta on March 3, 2007. The story centers around an evil counterpart of Arale created by Dr. Mashirito Jr., named Abale. It was later included alongside all the other films in the DVD box set Slump the Box Movies, released on September 21, 2008.

Reception
Reviewing the first five movies, Carl Kimlinger of Anime News Network summarized Dr. Slump as "random silly adventures[...] delivered with a lot of surreal nonsense humor, only the most basic sense of continuity, and not a whiff of substance or seriousness." He believed that a large portion of the humor simply comes from the graphics, saying that the old-fashioned hand-drawn animation and art provide a "warmth" and "lift Slump's visuals above" that of other anime. However, he called the background music "non-descript" and stated that the films are only for viewers who are familiar with the series, as they provide no exposition.

Mike Toole, also of ANN, included "Hoyoyo!" Space Adventure at number 75 on The Other 100 Best Anime Movies of All Time, a list of "lesser-known, lesser-loved classics." He called it an "artfully silly poke at the sci-fi boom of the late 70s and early 80s, skewering everything from Close Encounters of the Third Kind to THX-1138," yet also including "poop jokes, booger jokes, Ultraman references, dumb comedy routines, and weirdly evocative, exciting space battles."

References

Film series introduced in 1981
Dr. Slump (film series)
Films
Anime film series
Anime films based on manga
Comedy anime and manga
Lists of comedy films
Dr. Slump
Science fiction anime and manga
Science fiction film series
Discotek Media
Lists of films by franchise
Lists of films based on manga